Fiery furnace may refer to:

 The fiery furnace of the biblical account of Shadrach, Meshach, and Abednego (Daniel 3)
 Fiery Furnace (Arches National Park), a region of Utah's Arches National Park
 The Fiery Furnaces, a rock band
 The Burning Fiery Furnace, one of the church parables by Benjamin Britten